13 Kiddie Favorites is a compilation album by the punk rock band Jughead's Revenge, released in 1995. It is a collection of b-sides and never-before material. Although it is often referred to as the band's follow-up to Elimination, this appears to be factually incorrect.

Track listing

Personnel
 Joe Doherty − vocals
 Joey Rimicci − guitar
 Brian Preiss − bass
 Jarrod Thornton − drums

References

Jughead's Revenge compilation albums
1995 compilation albums
BYO Records compilation albums